Orange County Courthouse is a historic courthouse complex located at Orange, Orange County, Virginia. It was built in 1858–1859, and is a 1 1/2-story, Italian Villa style brick structure. The front facade features a three-part arcade consisting of a semi-elliptical arch flanked by small semicircular arches. Above the arcade is a three-stage tower consisting of the main entrance as the first stage; a clock, installed within existing round windows in 1949, as the second stage; and arched openings with louvres covered by a shallow hip roof and topped by a finial complete the tower. Associated with the courthouse are the contributing clerk's office (1894) and jail (1891).

It was listed on the National Register of Historic Places in 1979.  It is located in the Orange Commercial Historic District.

References

Courthouses on the National Register of Historic Places in Virginia
County courthouses in Virginia
Italianate architecture in Virginia
Government buildings completed in 1859
Buildings and structures in Orange County, Virginia
National Register of Historic Places in Orange County, Virginia
Individually listed contributing properties to historic districts on the National Register in Virginia